Andrew Hosie was a Scottish amateur footballer who made over 170 appearances as a right back in the Scottish League for Queen's Park. He represented Scotland at amateur level and captained the team on occasion.

References

Scottish footballers
Scottish Football League players
Footballers from Glasgow
Place of death missing
Date of death missing
Association football wing halves
Year of birth missing
Scotland amateur international footballers
Queen's Park F.C. players